Woodlands is a historic home located near Columbia, Richland County, South Carolina. It was built in 1896, and is a two-story, wood-frame farmhouse with a cross-gable roof and classical and Folk Victorian ornamentation. The front facade features a grand two-tiered porch.  Also on the property is a detached kitchen building.  Woodlands was the home of Harry R. E. Hampton (1897-1980), a leading journalist and conservationist in South Carolina.

It was added to the National Register of Historic Places in 2006.

References

Houses on the National Register of Historic Places in South Carolina
Victorian architecture in South Carolina
Houses completed in 1896
Houses in Columbia, South Carolina
National Register of Historic Places in Richland County, South Carolina